In television broadcasting a double box is a graphical overlay on the screen with two rectangular "holes" where two separate video sources are inserted. A double box is typically used for two live shots from different locations, with a conversation taking place between the participants; i.e., an interview, or a dialog between a remote reporter and an anchor in the studio.

The double box graphic is created and controlled from a character generator, such as a Chyron or Avid Deko. The video sources are then mixed together by a switcher for play to air.

Television terminology